Acleris celiana, Celiana's Acleris, is a species of moth of the family Tortricidae. It is found in North America, where it has been recorded from Alberta, British Columbia, Illinois, Maine, Massachusetts, Michigan, Minnesota, New Brunswick, New Hampshire, North Carolina, North Dakota, Ontario, Quebec, Virginia and Wisconsin.

The wingspan is about 18 mm. The forewings are red-brown with an oblique whitish antemedian band, sprinkled with dark dots and with a waved edge. Adults have been recorded on wing from March to November.

The larvae feed on Prunus virginiana, Betula (including Betula nana and Betula papyrifera) and Salix species.

References

Moths described in 1869
celiana
Moths of North America